REV Group, Inc. (formerly Allied Specialty Vehicles) is an American manufacturer of specialty vehicles including ambulances, buses, firefighting apparatus, and recreational vehicles among others.

History
Allied Specialty Vehicles was formed in 2010 from the merger of four companies owned by American Industrial Partners: Collins Industries, E-One, Halcore Group, and Fleetwood Enterprises.

In September 2010, ASV acquired the assets of ambulance manufacturer Road Rescue from Spartan Motors.

In 2013, three acquisitions were announced. SJC Industries was purchased in May 2013 from Thor Industries. It is a manufacturer of ambulances under the brand names McCoy Miller and Marque.

A week later, it was announced that ASV was purchasing the RV assets of Navistar International, which include Monaco, Holiday Rambler, R-Vision and the Beaver and Safari brands.

In August 2013, ASV announced the purchase of Thor Industries' bus businesses, including the ElDorado Motor Corp., National Coach, Champion Bus, and Goshen Coach companies.

Allied Specialty Vehicles changed its name to REV Group in November 2015.

In April 2016, REV Group acquired fire truck manufacturer Kovatch Mobile Equipment Corp.

In January 2017, the company went public with ticker symbol REVG.

In 2017, REV Group acquired Ferrara Fire Apparatus and Renegade RV.

In January 2018, REV Group acquired California-based Lance Camper. Lance was founded in 1965 and manufactures truck campers and towable RVs.

In February 2020, REV Group announced its acquisition of Spartan ER, a subsidiary of Spartan Motors.

In May 2020, REV Group sold its shuttle bus brands Champion, Federal Coach, World Trans, Krystal Coach, ElDorado and Goshen Coach to Forest River.

In September 2021 REV it will close KME fire-truck apparatus plants in Virginia and Pennsylvania over the next year and transition production to other facilities in Brookfield-based Rev Group’s fire-equipment manufacturing group.

Divisions

References

External links

Manufacturing companies established in 2010
Private equity portfolio companies
Companies based in Wisconsin
Emergency services equipment makers
Fire service vehicle manufacturers
School bus manufacturers
Recreational vehicle manufacturers
Bus manufacturers of the United States